Oscar Walter Cisek ([tsízek] or [tšisek]; 6 December 1897 - 30 May 1966) was a Romanian writer, diplomat, and art critic, who authored short stories, novels, poems and essays in both German and Romanian.

Biography
Of Transylvanian Saxon descent, Cisek was born and died in Bucharest. After attending Bucharest's Evangelischen Schule, he graduated in German studies and Art history from the University of Munich.

Noted for his art chronicle and essays in the literary magazine Gândirea, he helped popularize modernist and avant-garde cultural trends in 1920s Romania. After 1930, he entered the diplomatic corps of the Romanian Kingdom, serving as Cultural and Press Attaché in Austria, Czechoslovakia, and Germany. In 1946-1947, after the start of Soviet occupation in Romania and until the Communist regime was established, Cisek was General Consul in Berlin.

He was imprisoned by Communist authorities, and, after being set free, resumed his work as a writer in Bucharest. Rehabilitated, Cisek was a recipient of the Romanian Academy's Ion Creangă Prize shortly before his death, and became a corresponding member of the German Democratic Republic's Akademie der Künste.

Works in German
 Die Tatarin (1929)
 Strom ohne Ende (1937)
 Vor den Toren (1950)
 Das Reisigfeuer (1960)

External links
 Bibliography at the German National Library

Gândirea
Romanian people of German descent
Transylvanian Saxon people
Romanian people of Czech descent
Writers from Bucharest
Romanian art critics
Diplomats from Bucharest
Romanian essayists
Romanian male novelists
Romanian male poets
Romanian writers in German
1897 births
1966 deaths
20th-century Romanian poets
20th-century Romanian novelists
Ludwig Maximilian University of Munich alumni
Male essayists
20th-century essayists
20th-century Romanian male writers